Mandadam is a Village in Guntur district in Indian state of Andhra Pradesh. It was a village in Thullur mandal of Guntur district, prior to its denotification as gram panchayat.

History 
King Ganapati Deva of Kakatiya Dynasty who ruled between 1199 AD to 1261AD had gifted the two villages of Mandadam and Velagapudi to Sivacharya, spiritual preceptor of Golaki Matham at Mandadam. 

A 13th century stone inscription erected to commemorate the birth celebrations of Rani Rudrama Devi, a ruler of Kakatiya dynasty, lays in a state of neglect at Mandadam village. The inscription erected by Emperor Ganapati Deva, known popularly as Malkapuram inscription, is a rare archaeological find commemorating the achievements of Kakatiya dynasty. At Mandadam, Ganapati Deva crowned his daughter Rudrama Devi as his successor and latter ruled for another 30 years, scripting a golden chapter in the 13th century. Erected on a huge granite pillar measuring 14.6 X 2.9 X2.9 feet, the inscription has 182 lines engraved in Sanskrit and Telugu indicating the birth of Rudrama Devi, her coronation, extent of land donated to Visweswara temple and lists out the charitable works taken up in the village. It also refers to an educational building, presumably a college for teaching Sanskrit and Shaivite texts.

Geography 
It is located at a distance of 3 km from Krishna River. It is 8 km distance from VIT University. 9.2 km distance from SRM University. and 13 km distance from  AIIMS Mangalagiri. 7 km from Andhra Pradesh High Court
Close to all the Facilities. Very accessible location, 4.2 km to TTD Lord Venkateswara Temple

2 km to Andhra pradesh secretariat and Assembly. its 10 km to Amritha university, 14 kms to NRI Academy of Medical Sciences and Manipal Hospital Vijayawada

Its one of the village which farmers have Donated there Land to the new capital of the state "AMARAVATI"

This is a prime location and have lot of things to offer when it comes to Banking sector Mandadam have almost all the banks  Bank of Baroda, State Bank of India, Union Bank of India, Coastal Local Area Bank, Central Bank of India, Punjab National Bank, Co-operative society Banking

Demographics 

The average literacy rate stands at 68.95 percent, with  literates.

Transport 

Mandadam is located on Vijayawada and Amaravati route. APSRTC run buses offers transport services in the route., its very close to Vijayawada via Karakatta around 12kms,Center of Mandadam is always crowded with secretariat employees and Construction workers

References 

 Neighbourhoods in Amaravati